Bruce Mortimer Stanley Campbell, FBA, MRIA, MAE, FRHistS, FAcSS (born 11 June 1949) is a British economic historian. From 1995 to 2014, he was Professor of Medieval Economic History at Queen's University Belfast, where he remains an emeritus professor.

Career 
Bruce Mortimer Stanley Campbell was born in Hertfordshire on 11 June 1949 to Reginald Arthur Mortimer and Mary Campbell. After graduating from the University of Liverpool in 1970 with a first-class Bachelor of Arts degree in geography, Campbell completed his doctorate under the supervision of Dr Alan Baker at Darwin College, Cambridge, in 1975, with a thesis entitled "Field systems in eastern Norfolk during the Middle Ages: a study with particular reference to the demographic and agrarian changes of the fourteenth century". He lectured in geography at Queen's University Belfast from 1973 and the university appointed him to a readership in economic history in 1992; he remained in that post until his appointment as Professor of Medieval Economic History in 1995. According to his British Academy profile, his research relates to "the economic history of late-medieval Britain and Ireland, with particular reference to human-environment interactions during the 14th century and trends in agricultural output and productivity from the 13th to 19th centuries".

Honours 
Campbell was elected a Fellow of the Royal Historical Society in 2001, an Academician of Social Sciences (later renamed Fellow of the Academy of Social Sciences) two years later, and a Fellow of the British Academy (FBA), the United Kingdom's national academy for the humanities and social sciences, in 2009. He has also been a Member of the Royal Irish Academy since 1997 and a Member of the Academia Europaea since 2013. He also won the Economic History Association's Arthur H. Cole Prize in 1984, and his book English Seigniorial Agriculture 1250–1450 (2000) was named proxime accesit for the Royal Historical Society's Whitfield Prize in 2000. He was the dedicatee of a festschrift edited by Maryanne Kowaleski, John Langdon and Phillipp Schofield: Peasants and Lords in the Medieval English Economy: Essays in Honour of Bruce M. S. Campbell (Brepols, 2015).

Selected works 
 The Great Transition: Climate, Disease and Society in the Late-Medieval World (Cambridge University Press, 2016).
 (Co-authored with Stephen N. Broadberry, Alexander Klein, Bas van Leeuwen and Mark Overton) British Economic Growth, 1270–1870 (Cambridge University Press, 2015).
 "Nature as historical protagonist: environment and society in pre-industrial England" (the 2008 Tawney Memorial Lecture), Economic History Review, vol. 63, no. 2 (2010), pp. 281–314.
 Field Systems and Farming Systems in Late Medieval England (Ashgate, 2008).
 Land and People in Late Medieval England (Ashgate, 2007).
 The Medieval Antecedents of English Agricultural Progress (Ashgate, 2007).
 (Co-authored with Ken Bartley) England on the Eve of the Black Death: An Atlas of Lay Lordship, Land, and Wealth, 1300–49 (Manchester University Press, 2006).
 English Seigniorial Agriculture 1250–1450 (Cambridge University Press, 2000).
 (Edited with R. H. Britnell) A Commercialising Economy: England 1086–c. 1300 (Manchester University Press, 1995).
 (Co-authored with James A. Galloway, Derek Keene and Margaret Murphy) A Medieval Capital and its Grain Supply: Agrarian Production and its Distribution in the London Region c. 1300, Historical Geography Research series, no. 30 (Institute of British Geographers, 1993).
 (Edited) Before the Black Death: Studies in the "Crisis" of the Early Fourteenth Century (Manchester University Press, 1991).
 (Co-edited with Mark Overton) Land, Labour and Livestock: Historical Studies in European Agricultural Productivity (Manchester University Press, 1991).

Campbell has also produced a database, Three Centuries of English Crop Yields, 1211–1491, bringing together data on pre-modern harvests.

References 

Living people
1949 births
Economic historians
Alumni of the University of Liverpool
Alumni of Darwin College, Cambridge
Academics of Queen's University Belfast
Fellows of the British Academy
Members of the Royal Irish Academy
Members of Academia Europaea
Fellows of the Royal Historical Society
Fellows of the Academy of Social Sciences
Historians of agriculture
Historical geographers